The Lower North Shore refers to the northern suburbs of Sydney adjoining Sydney Harbour. The three bodies of water that surround the Lower North Shore are Lane Cove River on its western border, Sydney Harbour on its south side, and Middle Harbour on its east. The Lower North Shore borders the Upper North Shore when the Lane Cover River and Middle Harbour are at their closest.

Lower North Shore encompasses suburbs belonging to the local government areas of Municipality of Mosman, City of Willoughby, Municipality of Lane Cove, and North Sydney Council. The Lower North Shore, in this narrow sense, roughly corresponds with the Parish of Willoughby, a cadastral unit used for land title purposes.

The Lower North Shore suburbs adjacent to the water are Longueville, Northwood, Neutral Bay, Greenwich, Waverton, Wollstonecraft, Mosman, Cremorne, Lane Cove, Lavender Bay, McMahons Point, Milsons Point, Cammeray, North Sydney, Chatswood, Artarmon, Willoughby, Crows Nest, Riverview and Naremburn. 

The region is home to hundreds of parks and reserves, including Sydney Harbour National Park and the Lane Cove National Park. Local sportsgrounds include North Sydney Oval, the region's largest in capacity, followed by Chatswood Oval.
Major waterways in the region include Port Jackson, the Lane Cove River, the Parramatta River, Middle Harbour and the many creek systems that branch out from these main aquatic lifelines.

The Lower North Shore is the location of Kirribilli House and Admiralty House, the official residences in Sydney of the Prime Minister of Australia and Governor-General of Australia respectively.

References

Geography of Sydney